Robert H. Parker may refer to:

 R. Hunt Parker (1892–1969), American jurist
 Robert Henry Parker (1932–2016), British accounting scholar